The following is a list of notable month-long observances, recurrent months that are used by various governments, groups and organizations to raise awareness of an issue, commemorate a group or event, or celebrate something.

January
 Dry January
 Veganuary (United Kingdom)
 National Mentoring Month (United States)
 Slavery and Human Trafficking Prevention Month (United States)

February
 American Heart Month (United States)
 Black History Month (United States, Canada, and Germany)
 LGBT History Month (United Kingdom)
 National Bird-Feeding Month (United States)

March
 Brain Tumor Awareness Month (United Kingdom)
 Irish-American Heritage Month
 Mustache March
 National Colon Cancer Awareness Month
 Women's History Month
 Youth Art Month

April
 Arab American Heritage Month
 Cancer Control Month
 Confederate History Month
 Dalit History Month
 Financial Literacy Month
 Jazz Appreciation Month
 Mathematics Awareness Month
 National Child Abuse Prevention Month
 National Pet Month (United Kingdom)
 National Poetry Month
 National Poetry Writing Month
 National Volunteer Month
 School Library Month
 Second Chance Month
 Sexual Assault Awareness Month

May
 ALS Awareness Month (United States)
 Asian Pacific American Heritage Month
 Brain Tumor Awareness Month (excluding United Kingdom)
 Celiac Awareness Month
 Flores de Mayo (Philippines)
 Haitian Heritage Month
 International Masturbation Month
 Jewish American Heritage Month (USA)
 May devotions to the Blessed Virgin Mary
 Mental Health Awareness Month
 National Bike Month
National Military Appreciation Month
 National Foster Care Month
 National Guide Dog Month (2008, 2009)
 National Pet Month (United States)
 National Smile Month (United Kingdom, May and June)
 National Stroke Awareness Month
 South Asian Heritage Month (Ontario, Canada)

June
 African-American Music Appreciation Month
 ALS Awareness Month (Canada)
 Caribbean-American Heritage Month
 LGBT Pride Month
 National Safety Month
 National Smile Month (United Kingdom, May and June)

July 
 National Ice Cream Month
 Disability Pride Month

August 
 Buwan ng Wika

September 
 Amerindian Heritage Month (Guyana)
 Gospel Music Heritage Month
 National Bourbon Heritage Month
 National Childhood Cancer Awareness Month
 National Guide Dog Month (US)
 National Hispanic Heritage Month (US; September 15 to October 15)
 National Honey Month
 National Preparedness Month
 National Prostate Health Month
 National Yoga Month
 Pain Awareness Month

October
 Black History Month (United Kingdom, Ireland, Netherlands)
 Breast Cancer Awareness Month
 Filipino American History Month (United States)
 Italian-American Heritage and Culture Month (United States)
 LGBT History Month (US and Canada)
 National Arts & Humanities Month
 National Cyber Security Awareness Month
 National Disability Employment Awareness Month
 National Hispanic Heritage Month (US; September 15 to October 15)
 National Pizza Month
 National Work and Family Month
 Polish American Heritage Month

November
 Academic Writing Month
 Black Catholic History Month
 COPD Awareness Month
 Indigenous Disability Awareness Month (Canada)
 Movember
 National Novel Writing Month
 Native American Indian/Alaska Native Heritage Month
 No Nut November

December 
 Advent – begins on the fourth Sunday before Christmas (November 27-December 3) and ends on Christmas Day (December 25).

See also
 Ramadan
 List of observances in the United States by presidential proclamation
 List of awareness days
 International observance
 List of environmental dates

Notes 
 First Presidential Proclamation for National Caribbean American Heritage Month was June 6, 2006 by President George Bush. First City to Proclaim Caribbean Heritage Month Washington DC 2000.

References

External links
 Unite
 Alzheimer's & Brain Awareness Month

Month